Putlitz is a town in the district of Prignitz, in Brandenburg, Germany. It is situated 15 km northwest of Pritzwalk, and 35 km northeast of Wittenberge.

Demography

Gallery

International relations

Putlitz is twinned with:
 Kaltenkirchen, Germany

References

External links

Localities in Prignitz